Kosoy Khutor is a rural locality (a settlement) in Kosteltsevsky Selsoviet Rural Settlement, Kurchatovsky District, Kursk Oblast, Russia. Population:

Geography 
The settlement is located 67.5 km from the Russia–Ukraine border, 37 km west of Kursk, 9.5 km north of the district center – the town Kurchatov, 11.5 km from the selsoviet center – Kosteltsevo.

 Climate
Kosoy Khutor has a warm-summer humid continental climate (Dfb in the Köppen climate classification).

Transport 
Kosoy Khutor is located 29 km from the federal route  Crimea Highway, 9 km from the road of regional importance  (Kursk – Lgov – Rylsk – border with Ukraine), 26.5 km from the road  (Lgov – Konyshyovka), 2.5 km from the road of intermunicipal significance  (Seym River – Mosolovo – Nizhneye Soskovo), 3 km from the road Kurchatov – Zhmakino – Checheviznya, 9.5 km from the nearest railway halt Kurchatow (railway line Lgov I — Kursk).

The rural locality is situated 43.5 km from Kursk Vostochny Airport, 137 km from Belgorod International Airport and 247 km from Voronezh Peter the Great Airport.

References

Notes

Sources

Rural localities in Kurchatovsky District, Kursk Oblast